Lee Alton Royster (April 29, 1937 – June 24, 2004) was an American football and basketball coach. He served as the head football coach at Shaw University from 1965 to 1966 and again on an interim basis in 1978. Royster was also the head basketball coach at Hampton University during the 1963–64 season.

Head coaching record

Football

Notes

References

1937 births
2004 deaths
American football quarterbacks
Basketball coaches from Virginia
Florida A&M Rattlers football players
Hampton Pirates men's basketball coaches
Lane Dragons football coaches
Players of American football from Virginia
Shaw Bears football coaches
Shaw Bears men's basketball coaches
St. Augustine's Falcons football coaches
St. Augustine's Falcons men's basketball coaches
Sportspeople from Hampton, Virginia